Strymon yojoa, the yojoa scrub-hairstreak, is a species of hairstreak in the butterfly family Lycaenidae.

The MONA or Hodges number for Strymon yojoa is 4341.

References

Further reading

 

Eumaeini
Articles created by Qbugbot
Butterflies described in 1867